Lee Soo-man (born 18 June 1952) is a South Korean business executive and record producer who is best known for being the founder of SM Entertainment, a multinational South Korean entertainment company based in Seoul. He has also been referred to as the "president of culture", as one of the pioneers of the Korean Wave. Lee debuted as a singer in 1971 while he was a student at Seoul National University. In 1989, he founded SM Entertainment, which has since become one of the largest entertainment companies in the country.

Biography

1952–1980: Early years and singing career
Lee was born in Jeonju, South Korea on 18 June 1952, and attended Seoul National University on and off between 1971 and 1979. Lee debuted as a member of the band April and May (사월과 오월, alternatively 4월과 5월) in 1972 (he had joined the band in 1971), but he later departed from it due to health reasons. He gained spotlight for his "good boy" image, supported by the fact that he was one of the few people who were not involved in the weed scandal among Korean celebrities in 1975, and his high academic credentials in Seoul National University. He became known for hit songs such as "행복 (Happiness)", released in 1978, and "한송이 꿈 (A Piece of Dream)" released in 1976. In 1977, he was a member of the Korean indie band . In addition to his career as a musician and his studies in university, he worked as a radio DJ and TV host during this time.
Lee Soo-man was also known for his trio with singers Lee Moon-sae and  called Masamtrio (馬三트리오), named as such because of their appearances that resemble that of a long face of a horse.
In 1980, he formed the band 이수만과 365일 (Lee Soo-man and The 365 Days). However, media censorship policies under the Chun Doo-hwan government discouraged him from a career in the Korean music industry.

1980–1985: Studies in the United States
In the early 1980s, Lee decided to leave the entertainment world in order to pursue a career in computer engineering. He went abroad to work on a master's degree at California State University, Northridge, where he witnessed the rise of "superstars of the MTV generation" such as Michael Jackson. Inspired by the heyday of MTV in the United States, Lee set his sights on laying the foundation for the modern Korean pop music industry. In 1985, he returned to Korea "with a vision of what the Korean music industry could be."

1985–present: Founding SM Entertainment

Following his return to Korea, Lee ventured back into the entertainment world by working as a DJ and presenter. In 1989, after four years of saving money and gaining experience in the industry, he established an entertainment company called SM Studio (named after his initials) in the Apgujeong neighborhood of Seoul, and signed singer Hyun Jin-young. During the 1990s, SM Studio developed an in-house system that looked after all aspects of its artists' careers. Lee's approach was targeted at teenage audiences, and took a holistic view of the qualities needed to become a successful entertainer. The company was renamed SM Entertainment in 1995.

In February 2010, Lee resigned from his position as a member of SM's board of directors, but maintained a role in the company's "management and artist development" divisions.

On 23 January 2020, Lee Soo-man was listed by Billboard as one of the world's influential music industry leaders.

On 5 February 2020, it was revealed by Jeff Benjamin writing for Forbes that Lee Soo-man worked on South Korean girl group Loona's EP [#], which was his first ever project away from namesake SM Entertainment.

Personal life
Lee's wife, Kim Eun-jin, died from cancer on 30 September 2014.

Lee is the paternal uncle of Sunny, one of the members of the popular SM group Girls' Generation.

Philanthropy 
On 8 March 2022, Lee donated  million to the Hope Bridge Disaster Relief Association to help those affected by the massive wildfires that started in Uljin, Gyeongbuk. and also spread to Samcheok, Gangwon. Other social causes include:

Global Citizen, "Global Goal Live: The Possible Dream," 2021
Chief director and executive producer, Asia
SM Entertainment and Dream Maker Entertainment selected to host concert in Seoul and represent Asia for the biggest social cause event in history
UNICEF, SMile For U Campaign, 2016-2022
Supporting children, parents, childcare workers, and educators in Asian regions to receive quality music education
Target areas include Hanoi, Da Nang, Kon Tum, Gia Lai, and Dien Bien (Vietnam)
SMile Social Service Corp., SM Entertainment, 2014–present
Monthly and daily events for volunteer activities among SM Entertainment staff and artists
Activities include infant care, support for impaired youth, abandoned animal care, tree planting, and more
Continuously developing and increasing participant numbers: up from 130 in its first year to 462 participants in 2019
Korean Red Cross, disaster relief, 2014
Personal donation for the victims of the Sewol Ferry incident, one of the gravest tragedies in South Korean history

Controversy

Embezzlement case and conviction
In 2002, the Supreme Prosecutors' Office of the Republic of Korea found evidence of Lee earning 10 billions worth of illegal market profits in August 1999 by acquiring 1.1 billion worth of stocks when listing stocks of SM Entertainment at KOSDAQ by a paid-in capital increase. The Supreme Prosecutors' Office of the Republic of Korea also investigated Lee regarding circumstantial evidence of lobbying to producers in broadcasting stations and keeping a tremendous amount of cash in his personal office and vaults.

Lee tried to escape prosecution by staying overseas from June 2002, and was found in a golf course in Los Angeles on 2 August in the same year. While on the run, Lee's passport was nullified and Lee was chased by Interpol. Lee eventually came back to Korea to be investigated on 22 May 2003. A pre-arrest warrant was issued on 7 October, and Lee was arrested on 8 October. On 14 October, Lee was approved of bail after paying 30 million won. On 19 October, Lee was prosecuted without detention.

In September 2004, the Supreme Court of Korea sentenced Lee to two years of imprisonment along with three years of probation. Lee was released in a special exemption in 2007 commemorating the fourth year of Roh Moo-hyun's presidency.

Slave contract
In 2009, three members of the boy band TVXQ took their management agency SM Entertainment owned by Lee to court, claiming that the agency's 13-year-contract (often nicknamed a slave contract) was too long, too restrictive, and gave them almost none of the profits from their success. The following year, in 2010, South Korea's Fair Trade Commission (KFTC) created a rule that limited entertainment contracts to seven years.

Pandora Papers
Lee Soo-man was included in the names of figures in the Pandora Papers.

Discography

Albums 
 Lee Soo-man (Jigu Records, 1977)
 Lee Soo-man (Shinsegae, 1978)
 애창곡집 (Jigu Records, 1978)
 Greatest (Universal Record Co., 1980)
 Lee Soo-man (Shinsegae, 1983)
 Lee Soo-man (Han Kook Record, 1985)
 끝이 없는 순간 (Asia Record Co., 1986)
 NEW AGE 2 (Han Kook Record, January 1989)
 NEW AGE (Asia Record Co., November 1989)

Awards

State and cultural honors

Listicles

Notes

References

External links 
 SM Entertainment – Official website

1952 births
Living people
20th-century South Korean male singers
20th-century South Korean businesspeople
21st-century South Korean businesspeople
Asia Game Changer Award winners
Businesspeople from Seoul
California State University, Northridge alumni
Kyungbock High School alumni
Musicians from Seoul
People named in the Pandora Papers
Seoul National University alumni
SM Entertainment people
South Korean chief executives
South Korean DJs
South Korean folk rock singers
South Korean music industry executives
South Korean pop singers
South Korean radio presenters
South Korean record producers
South Korean rock guitarists
South Korean television presenters